Atterdag Wermelin (1861–1904) was a Swedish revolutionary socialist, writer and poet, a pioneer of the labor movement, who, together with August Palm, introduced Marxism to Sweden in the 1880s.

Wermelin came into dispute with Hjalmar Branting over the issue of political collaboration with the liberals, which the latter favored, and Branting made sure to politically isolate Wermelin. Conditions worsened for Wermelin since he was black-listed and could not find a job. He was eventually forced to emigrate to the United States in 1887 and settled in Chicago. He ended his life by committing suicide in the Chicago River.

1861 births
1904 suicides
Marxist writers
Suicides in Illinois
Swedish socialists
Swedish political writers
Swedish poets
Swedish male writers
Writers from Chicago
Swedish male poets
19th-century Swedish poets
19th-century male writers
Suicides by drowning in the United States